Sebastián Ignacio Leyton Hevia (born 13 May 1993) is a Chilean footballer who plays for Unión Española.

Career
He debuted on 15 April 2011, in a 2-0 victory of Universidad de Chile against Unión La Calera for the 2011 Torneo Apertura.

In 2022, he moved to Colombia and joined Deportivo Cali, returning to Chile in the second half of the year to join Unión Española.

Honours

Club
Universidad de Chile
Primera División de Chile (3): 2011 Apertura, 2011 Clausura, 2012 Apertura
Copa Sudamericana (1): 2011

References

External links

Living people
1993 births
People from Curicó
Chilean footballers
Chilean expatriate footballers
Universidad de Chile footballers
Deportes La Serena footballers
Curicó Unido footballers
C.D. Antofagasta footballers
Everton de Viña del Mar footballers
Unión La Calera footballers
Deportivo Cali footballers
Unión Española footballers
Chilean Primera División players
Primera B de Chile players
Categoría Primera A players
Expatriate footballers in Colombia
Chilean expatriate sportspeople in Colombia
Association football midfielders